Thomas Mayo may refer to:
 Thomas Mayo (physician) (1790–1871), British physician
 Thomas Mayo (gridiron football) (born 1990), American football wide receiver